Nathaniel Harris may refer to:

 Nathaniel Edwin Harris (1846–1929), American lawyer and politician, Governor of Georgia
 Nathaniel H. Harris (1834–1900), Confederate States Army brigadier general